Santa Barbara, officially the Municipality of Santa Barbara, is a 1st class municipality in the province of Pangasinan, Philippines. According to the 2020 census, it has a population of 92,187 people.

Geography
The town of Santa Barbara lies on a plain terrain in the northern part of the Agno Valley, at the center of Pangasinan. It is just west of the business center of Urdaneta City, with centuries-old mango trees lining the national highway to Santa Barbara. Ten kilometers further west is Dagupan along Lingayen Gulf, and to its south is the town of Malasiqui and beyond it the City of San Carlos.

Barangays
Santa Barbara is politically subdivided into 29 barangays. These barangays are headed by elected officials: Barangay Captain, Barangay Council, whose members are called Barangay Councilors. All are elected every three years.

Climate

Demographics

Santa Barbara is populated mainly by Pangasinans with a sprinkling of other ethnic groups led by the Ilocanos.

It is largely a suburban community with much of its population densely concentrated in 29 barangays. By the year 2016, the town's population was projected to have reached 86,269, with a growth rate of 3.75 percent per year for the past seven years, faster than the national average.

A high level of self-sufficiency in food is likewise gleaned in the town's minimal rate of malnutrition of only .50 percent severely malnourished out of 5.12 percent malnourished -pre-school children. The public school system is also proud of having an unusually low drop-out rate in the elementary grades and high school.

Economy 

More than half of the families or roughly 60 percent are farmers who till the northern part of the rich Agno Valley.  The average family income as of the 2000 national census, was a low P9,662.67 a year. Maybe because the average farming family does not buy, but produce the bulk of its own food, family expenditures were lower at P7,545.42.  The average Santa Barbaran family has a disposable income of over P2,000 a year despite statistical data that had shown that a family In the Ilocos region needed PhP 14,749.00 in income a year to survive.

The poverty rate in Santa Barbara is high as the average income is even lower than the regional poverty threshold. But food self-sufficiency has saved its town folks from sliding to the ranks of the very poor.

Although a large part of Santa Barbara is fast getting urbanized, the main economic activity remains to farm.  Rice remains its main crop with 6,662 hectares or close to all its total tillable lands devoted to rice farming. The second most important crop is mango of which the town is famous as the home of age-old Philippine mango seedling nurseries, a veritable home industry in town.

Rice and mango are the only crops that are raised in all its 29 barangays. The third most important crop in a variety of vegetables followed by corn. Legumes and root crops are grown in small quantities.

Their livestock includes cattle, carabao, hogs, goats, and dogs. They likewise raise native chickens for their food and some poultry farms commercially produce chicken layers and broilers.

Out of the farm produce, Santa Barbara has developed its own food processing industry that includes the making of rice cakes like latik and suman, nata-de coco making, and pickles from different fruits.

It likewise has a highly developed clay tile and pottery industry coupled with non-farm-based processing industries like candle and soap making and the making of hollow blocks for construction. The town has one industrial plant, the Ginebra San Miguel gin manufacturing plant in Tebag West barangay along the national highway towards Dagupan.

The town's business and trading center in and around the public market features a variety of wholesale and retail and other services establishments from farm inputs to construction materials.  The market serves as the place where its people buy their needs and sell their produce.  Transportation between the commercial center and the many barangays is served by a large fleet of individually owned tricycles.

Santa Barbara's close proximity to Urdaneta City, has, however, constrained the growth of its trading sector.

Urban development
Also owing to its suburban location and easy access to three nearby cities, Urdaneta, San Carlos, and Dagupan, Santa Barbara has attracted subdivision developers,  both for middle-class and low-cost markets.  As of mid-2008, it has attracted to its territory eight different housing projects including subdivisions developed by the company owned by Senate President Manny Villar and a pilot Gawad Kalinga housing project for the very poor embarked by the town government and its private sector partners.

Infrastructure
The town has a total of 137.509 linear kilometers of road network classified into national, provincial, municipal, and barangay roads. All the national highways passing through town and those under the town government have been paved. The 17 kilometers of provincial roads are about three-fourths paved while more than half (67.10%)  of 92.5 kilometers of barangay roads otherwise known as farm-to-market roads, needed concreting.

Unlike paved roads, electricity has reached all of the town's 29 barangays with about 80 percent of all households served. Power rates are much lower than in Metro Manila for both households, commercial and industrial users.

Two of the biggest landline telephone companies, PLDT and Digitel, plus one wireless company, Smart, serve the communication needs of the town although the unit to users ratio as of 2007 was still low at one phone for every 93 residents.

The local government-run Rural Health Unit and its 10 satellite barangay health centers, plus seven private medical clinics and one dental clinic serve the basic health needs of Santa Barbara residents.

Government
Santa Barbara, belonging to the third congressional district of the province of Pangasinan, is governed by a mayor designated as its local chief executive and by a municipal council as its legislative body in accordance with the Local Government Code. The mayor, vice mayor, and the councilors are elected directly by the people through an election which is being held every three years.

Elected officials

Education
Santa Barbara has an extensive public elementary and high school system. It has a total of 26 elementary schools supervised by two school districts plus 7 public high schools. These are staffed by 418 teachers and other school personnel with a student body of over 15,000 children in any given year.

Their healthy teacher to pupil ratio averaging one to 34 in the elementary grades and one is to 41 in high school and there are minimal drop-out rates of two percent in the elementary grades and less than four in every 100 students that enter high school. This was the state of things in Santa Barbara when the local leadership changed in mid-2007.

Religion
The heritage Santa Barbara Parish of the Holy Family Church, built in 1716, is part of the Roman Catholic Archdiocese of Lingayen-Dagupan, Vicariate III. Rev. Fr. Fidelis B. Layog is its Parish Priest, and Rev. Fr. Jim Cerezo is its Parish Vicar.

Gallery

References

External links

 Santa Barbara Profile at PhilAtlas.com
  Municipal Profile at the National Competitiveness Council of the Philippines
 Santa Barbara at the Pangasinan Government Website
 Local Governance Performance Management System
 [ Philippine Standard Geographic Code]
 Philippine Census Information

Municipalities of Pangasinan